List of Registered Historic Places in Bristol County, Massachusetts:


Cities and towns listed separately
Due to their large number of listings, some community listings are in separate articles, listed in this table.

Other cities and towns

|}

See also

List of National Historic Landmarks in Massachusetts

References

History of Bristol County, Massachusetts
Bristol
Buildings and structures in Bristol County, Massachusetts